The pronunciation of  is one of the few cases of ambiguity in German orthography.

Originally, in Middle High German, the sound  had been voiced in some dialects and was therefore written . Contemporary German has gone back to the unvoiced pronunciation, but idiosyncratically sometimes retained the medieval spelling.

Rules

 is pronounced 
 in the name of the letter ;
 in the frequent prefix  and all words constructed with it, such as  etc.;
 at the beginning of German family and place names, apart from names of foreign descent and few exceptions (this often leads to mispronunciations among English-speakers, who falsely use  in names like );
 at the beginning of Dutch family and place names; word-initial  is actually traditionally pronounced  in Dutch, although  is currently very common in the northern varieties, found in the Netherlands;
 at the end of words, e. g.  "nerve" (its forms and derivatives are also usually pronounced with : Nerven, nervös),  "naïve" (this word follows the rule of final obstruent devoicing, its forms and derivatives have :),  "brave" (its forms are pronounced with either  or).

 is pronounced  (or )
 in family and place names which are neither German nor Dutch.

 in the words  "gospel" and  "powder", where both alternatives may be considered standard;

German phonology